K. P. Khalid (10 October 1930 - 1 October 1994) was an Indian author writing in the Malayalam language. In 1988, he won the Kerala Sahitya Akademi Award for Novel for his work Ore Deshakkaraya Njangal.

Born on October 10, 1930, Khalid was in Raipur, Madhya Pradesh for a long time, working in a transport company and later in a trading agency. His literary works include Pithave Ninte Koode, Udayasooryanethire, Thuramukham, Simham, Banarasi Babu, Ore Deshakkaraya Njangal, Adimakal Udamakal and Allahuvinte Makkal.

References

1930 births
1994 deaths
Malayali people
Indian male novelists
Novelists from Kerala
Malayalam-language writers
Malayalam novelists
20th-century Indian male writers
20th-century Indian novelists
Recipients of the Kerala Sahitya Akademi Award